Mesocolpia nanula is a moth in the family Geometridae. It is found in Angola, Cape Verde, Comoros Madagascar, Eswatini, Gambia, Kenya, Mauritius, Réunion, Oman, Saudi Arabia, South Africa, Tanzania and Zimbabwe.

References

External links

Eupitheciini
Moths described in 1900